The 1980–81 Houston Rockets season saw the Rockets lose the NBA Finals. The 1981 Rockets are the only team since the 1959 Minneapolis Lakers to make the NBA Finals with a losing record.

In the playoffs, the Rockets defeated the defending NBA champion Los Angeles Lakers in three games in the First Round, then defeated the San Antonio Spurs in seven games in the Semifinals, and the Kansas City Kings in five games in the Conference Finals, reaching the NBA Finals for the first time in franchise history, only to fall to the Boston Celtics in six games in the NBA Finals.

Draft picks

Roster

Regular season
In the 1980–81 season, after the newly established Dallas Mavericks became the third NBA team in Texas, the NBA restructured the conferences and sent the Rockets, who had previously played in the Eastern Conference, to the Midwest Division of the Western Conference. It was head coach Del Harris's second season, and he led Houston to a 40–42 record. The Rockets tied with the Kansas City Kings for second place in the Midwest Division behind San Antonio. Houston had one game remaining to be played on its regular-season schedule when the team qualified for the playoffs. During the season, point guard Calvin Murphy set two NBA records, both of which had previously been held by Rick Barry. Murphy sank 78 consecutive free throws, to break Barry's mark of 60 set in 1976, and Murphy's season free-throw percentage was .958, breaking Barry's record of .947 set in 1979 (when Barry had been a member of the Rockets).

Season standings

Notes
z, y – division champions
x – clinched playoff spot

Record vs. opponents

Game log

Regular season

|- align="center" bgcolor="#ffcccc"
| 1
| October 10
| @ San Diego
| L 104–120
|
|
|
| San Diego Sports Arena
| 0–1
|- align="center" bgcolor="#ffcccc"
| 2
| October 12
| @ Los Angeles
| L 103–114
|
|
|
| The Forum
| 0–2
|- align="center" bgcolor="#ccffcc"
| 3
| October 15
| Seattle
| W 103–100
|
|
|
| The Summit
| 1–2
|- align="center" bgcolor="#ccffcc"
| 4
| October 17
| @ Portland
| W 102–99
|
|
|
| Memorial Coliseum
| 2–2
|- align="center" bgcolor="#ffcccc"
| 5
| October 18
| @ Golden State
| L 101–108
|
|
|
| Oakland–Alameda County Coliseum Arena
| 2–3
|- align="center" bgcolor="#ccffcc"
| 6
| October 21
| @ Denver
| W 119–117
|
|
|
| McNichols Sports Arena
| 3–3
|- align="center" bgcolor="#ffcccc"
| 7
| October 23
| Kansas City
| L 96–105
|
|
|
| The Summit
| 3–4
|- align="center" bgcolor="#ffcccc"
| 8
| October 25
| Detroit
| L 109–112
|
|
|
| The Summit
| 3–5
|- align="center" bgcolor="#ccffcc"
| 9
| October 29
| Dallas
| W 109–103
|
|
|
| The Summit
| 4–5

|- align="center" bgcolor="#ffcccc"
| 10
| November 5
| San Diego
| L 104–111
|
|
|
| The Summit
| 4–6
|- align="center" bgcolor="#ffcccc"
| 11
| November 8
| Phoenix
| L 115–116
|
|
|
| The Summit
| 4–7
|- align="center" bgcolor="#ccffcc"
| 12
| November 11
| @ Dallas
| W 105–94
|
|
|
| Reunion Arena
| 5–7
|- align="center" bgcolor="#ccffcc"
| 13
| November 12
| Los Angeles
| W 107–104
|
|
|
| The Summit
| 6–7
|- align="center" bgcolor="#ffcccc"
| 14
| November 14
| @ Utah
| L 115–117
|
|
|
| Salt Palace Acord Arena
| 6–8
|- align="center" bgcolor="#ffcccc"
| 15
| November 15
| @ Seattle
| L 139–143 (OT)
|
|
|
| Kingdome
| 6–9
|- align="center" bgcolor="#ccffcc"
| 16
| November 18
| Seattle
| W 138–118
|
|
|
| The Summit
| 7–9
|- align="center" bgcolor="#ccffcc"
| 17
| November 20
| @ Cleveland
| W 117–114
|
|
|
| Richfield Coliseum
| 8–9
|- align="center" bgcolor="#ccffcc"
| 18
| November 21
| @ New Jersey
| W 116–108
|
|
|
| Rutgers Athletic Center
| 9–9
|- align="center" bgcolor="#ffcccc"
| 19
| November 22
| @ Indiana
| L 120–129
|
|
|
| Market Square Arena
| 9–10
|- align="center" bgcolor="#ffcccc"
| 20
| November 24
| @ New York
| L 110–113 (OT)
|
|
|
| Madison Square Garden
| 9–11
|- align="center" bgcolor="#ffcccc"
| 21
| November 26
| Philadelphia
| L 100–101
|
|
|
| The Summit
| 9–12
|- align="center" bgcolor="#ccffcc"
| 22
| November 28
| @ San Antonio
| W 124–115
|
|
|
| HemisFair Arena
| 10–12
|- align="center" bgcolor="#ccffcc"
| 23
| November 29
| Dallas
| W 115–90
|
|
|
| The Summit
| 11–12
|- align="center" bgcolor="#ffcccc"
| 24
| November 30
| @ Phoenix
| L 114–117
|
|
|
| Arizona Veterans Memorial Coliseum
| 11–13

|- align="center" bgcolor="#ccffcc"
| 25
| December 3
| Cleveland
| W 118–109
|
|
|
| The Summit
| 12–13
|- align="center" bgcolor="#ffcccc"
| 26
| December 5
| @ Kansas City
| L 100–108
|
|
|
| Kemper Arena
| 12–14
|- align="center" bgcolor="#ccffcc"
| 27
| December 6
| Denver
| W 111–108
|
|
|
| The Summit
| 13–14
|- align="center" bgcolor="#ffcccc"
| 28
| December 10
| Los Angeles
| L 108–109
|
|
|
| The Summit
| 13–15
|- align="center" bgcolor="#ffcccc"
| 29
| December 12
| @ Portland
| L 100–106
|
|
|
| Memorial Coliseum
| 13–16
|- align="center" bgcolor="#ccffcc"
| 30
| December 13
| @ Golden State
| W 99–97
|
|
|
| Oakland–Alameda County Coliseum Arena
| 14–16
|- align="center" bgcolor="#ffcccc"
| 31
| December 17
| San Antonio
| L 107–113
|
|
|
| The Summit
| 14–17
|- align="center" bgcolor="#ffcccc"
| 32
| December 19
| @ Boston
| L 119–133
|
|
|
| Boston Garden
| 14–18
|- align="center" bgcolor="#ffcccc"
| 33
| December 20
| @ Chicago
| L 109–133
|
|
|
| Chicago Stadium
| 14–19
|- align="center" bgcolor="#ffcccc"
| 34
| December 21
| @ Milwaukee
| L 91–123
|
|
|
| MECCA Arena
| 14–20
|- align="center" bgcolor="#ffcccc"
| 35
| December 23
| Golden State
| L 99–114
|
|
|
| The Summit
| 14–21
|- align="center" bgcolor="#ccffcc"
| 36
| December 26
| @ Detroit
| W 114–94
|
|
|
| Pontiac Silverdome
| 15–21
|- align="center" bgcolor="#ffcccc"
| 37
| December 27
| @ Washington
| L 97–115
|
|
|
| Capital Centre
| 15–22
|- align="center" bgcolor="#ccffcc"
| 38
| December 30
| San Diego
| W 104–98
|
|
|
| The Summit
| 16–22

|- align="center" bgcolor="#ccffcc"
| 39
| January 1
| Utah
| W 117–103
|
|
|
| The Summit
| 17–22
|- align="center" bgcolor="#ccffcc"
| 40
| January 2
| @ Dallas
| W 124–120 (OT)
|
|
|
| Reunion Arena
| 18–22
|- align="center" bgcolor="#ffcccc"
| 41
| January 3
| Denver
| L 132–134
|
|
|
| The Summit
| 18–23
|- align="center" bgcolor="#ffcccc"
| 42
| January 7
| Kansas City
| L 108–114
|
|
|
| The Summit
| 18–24
|- align="center" bgcolor="#ffcccc"
| 43
| January 9
| @ Philadelphia
| L 94–107
|
|
|
| The Spectrum
| 18–25
|- align="center" bgcolor="#ccffcc"
| 44
| January 10
| Portland
| W 106–105
|
|
|
| The Summit
| 19–25
|- align="center" bgcolor="#ccffcc"
| 45
| January 14
| Chicago
| W 109–105
|
|
|
| The Summit
| 20–25
|- align="center" bgcolor="#ffcccc"
| 46
| January 16
| @ Phoenix
| L 89–92
|
|
|
| Arizona Veterans Memorial Coliseum
| 20–26
|- align="center" bgcolor="#ffcccc"
| 47
| January 17
| New York
| L 98–99
|
|
|
| The Summit
| 20–27
|- align="center" bgcolor="#ccffcc"
| 48
| January 18
| @ Denver
| W 98–97
|
|
|
| McNichols Sports Arena
| 21–27
|- align="center" bgcolor="#ccffcc"
| 49
| January 21
| Phoenix
| W 106–100
|
|
|
| The Summit
| 22–27
|- align="center" bgcolor="#ffcccc"
| 50
| January 23
| @ Kansas City
| L 107–113
|
|
|
| Kemper Arena
| 22–28
|- align="center" bgcolor="#ccffcc"
| 51
| January 24
| Utah
| W 106–91
|
|
|
| The Summit
| 23–28
|- align="center" bgcolor="#ccffcc"
| 52
| January 28
| New Jersey
| W 111–99
|
|
|
| The Summit
| 24–28
|- align="center" bgcolor="#ffcccc"
| 53
| January 29
| @ Utah
| L 97–99
|
|
|
| Salt Palace Acord Arena
| 24–29

|- align="center" bgcolor="#ccffcc"
| 54
| February 3
| Denver
| W 135–128 (OT)
|
|
|
| The Summit
| 25–29
|- align="center" bgcolor="#ccffcc"
| 55
| February 4
| Dallas
| W 116–68
|
|
|
| The Summit
| 26–29
|- align="center" bgcolor="#ffcccc"
| 56
| February 6
| @ Phoenix
| L 99–112
|
|
|
| Arizona Veterans Memorial Coliseum
| 26–30
|- align="center" bgcolor="#ccffcc"
| 57
| February 7
| Atlanta
| W 87–81
|
|
|
| The Summit
| 27–30
|- align="center" bgcolor="#ccffcc"
| 58
| February 11
| San Antonio
| W 108–89
|
|
|
| The Summit
| 28–30
|- align="center" bgcolor="#ffcccc"
| 59
| February 13
| Los Angeles
| L 105–114
|
|
|
| The Summit
| 28–31
|- align="center" bgcolor="#ffcccc"
| 60
| February 14
| Milwaukee
| L 112–117
|
|
|
| The Summit
| 28–32
|- align="center" bgcolor="#ffcccc"
| 61
| February 19
| @ San Diego
| L 99–116
|
|
|
| San Diego Sports Arena
| 28–33
|- align="center" bgcolor="#ccffcc"
| 62
| February 20
| @ Los Angeles
| W 110–107
|
|
|
| The Forum
| 29–33
|- align="center" bgcolor="#ccffcc"
| 63
| February 22
| @ Seattle
| W 111–96
|
|
|
| Kingdome
| 30–33
|- align="center" bgcolor="#ccffcc"
| 64
| February 23
| @ Utah
| W 106–102
|
|
|
| Salt Palace Acord Arena
| 31–33
|- align="center" bgcolor="#ccffcc"
| 65
| February 25
| Indiana
| W 101–100
|
|
|
| The Summit
| 32–33
|- align="center" bgcolor="#ccffcc"
| 66
| February 27
| Seattle
| W 96–92
|
|
|
| The Summit
| 33–33
|- align="center" bgcolor="#ffcccc"
| 67
| February 28
| San Diego
| L 103–104
|
|
|
| The Summit
| 33–34

|- align="center" bgcolor="#ffcccc"
| 68
| March 1
| @ San Antonio
| L 86–102
|
|
|
| HemisFair Arena
| 33–35
|- align="center" bgcolor="#ffcccc"
| 69
| March 4
| Boston
| L 101–108
|
|
|
| The Summit
| 33–36
|- align="center" bgcolor="#ffcccc"
| 70
| March 6
| Washington
| L 104–105
|
|
|
| The Summit
| 33–37
|- align="center" bgcolor="#ffcccc"
| 71
| March 7
| @ Atlanta
| L 108–114
|
|
|
| The Omni
| 33–38
|- align="center" bgcolor="#ccffcc"
| 72
| March 11
| Golden State
| W 109–92
|
|
|
| The Summit
| 34–38
|- align="center" bgcolor="#ccffcc"
| 73
| March 13
| Portland
| W 126–104
|
|
|
| The Summit
| 35–38
|- align="center" bgcolor="#ccffcc"
| 74
| March 14
| Utah
| W 101–82
|
|
|
| The Summit
| 36–38
|- align="center" bgcolor="#ffcccc"
| 75
| March 15
| @ Denver
| L 127–138
|
|
|
| McNichols Sports Arena
| 36–39
|- align="center" bgcolor="#ffcccc"
| 76
| March 18
| @ Golden State
| L 117–118
|
|
|
| Oakland–Alameda County Coliseum Arena
| 36–40
|- align="center" bgcolor="#ffcccc"
| 77
| March 20
| @ Portland
| L 103–107
|
|
|
| Memorial Coliseum
| 36–41
|- align="center" bgcolor="#ccffcc"
| 78
| March 22
| @ Kansas City
| W 114–108
|
|
|
| Kemper Arena
| 37–41
|- align="center" bgcolor="#ccffcc"
| 79
| March 24
| @ Dallas
| W 114–111 (OT)
|
|
|
| Reunion Arena
| 38–41
|- align="center" bgcolor="#ccffcc"
| 80
| March 25
| San Antonio
| W 117–111
|
|
|
| The Summit
| 39–41
|- align="center" bgcolor="#ccffcc"
| 81
| March 27
| Kansas City
| W 91–84
|
|
|
| The Summit
| 40–41
|- align="center" bgcolor="#ffcccc"
| 82
| March 29
| @ San Antonio
| L 109–135
|
|
|
| HemisFair Arena
| 40–42

Playoffs

|- align="center" bgcolor="#ccffcc"
| 1
| April 1
| @ Los Angeles
| W 111–107
| Moses Malone (38)
| Moses Malone (23)
| Allen Leavell (8)
| The Forum15,517
| 1–0
|- align="center" bgcolor="#ffcccc"
| 2
| April 3
| Los Angeles
| L 106–111
| Moses Malone (33)
| Moses Malone (15)
| Calvin Murphy (8)
| The Summit16,121
| 1–1
|- align="center" bgcolor="#ccffcc"
| 3
| April 5
| @ Los Angeles
| W 89–86
| Moses Malone (23)
| Moses Malone (15)
| Tom Henderson (7)
| The Forum14,813
| 2–1
|-

|- align="center" bgcolor="#ccffcc"
| 1
| April 7
| @ San Antonio
| W 107–98
| Moses Malone (27)
| Moses Malone (10)
| Reid, Murphy (6)
| HemisFair Arena13,319
| 1–0
|- align="center" bgcolor="#ffcccc"
| 2
| April 8
| @ San Antonio
| L 113–125
| Calvin Murphy (34)
| Moses Malone (12)
| Robert Reid (10)
| HemisFair Arena12,128
| 1–1
|- align="center" bgcolor="#ccffcc"
| 3
| April 10
| San Antonio
| W 112–99
| Moses Malone (41)
| Moses Malone (15)
| Reid, Murphy (4)
| The Summit16,121
| 2–1
|- align="center" bgcolor="#ffcccc"
| 4
| April 12
| San Antonio
| L 112–114
| Robert Reid (33)
| Moses Malone (9)
| Reid, Henderson (6)
| The Summit16,121
| 2–2
|- align="center" bgcolor="#ccffcc"
| 5
| April 14
| @ San Antonio
| W 123–117
| Calvin Murphy (36)
| Moses Malone (13)
| Tom Henderson (7)
| HemisFair Arena16,114
| 3–2
|- align="center" bgcolor="#ffcccc"
| 6
| April 15
| San Antonio
| L 96–101
| Moses Malone (36)
| Moses Malone (10)
| Reid, Henderson (7)
| The Summit16,121
| 3–3
|- align="center" bgcolor="#ccffcc"
| 7
| April 17
| @ San Antonio
| W 105–100
| Calvin Murphy (42)
| Moses Malone (16)
| Tom Henderson (8)
| HemisFair Arena16,114
| 4–3
|-

|- align="center" bgcolor="#ccffcc"
| 1
| April 21
| @ Kansas City
| W 97–78
| Moses Malone (29)
| Moses Malone (12)
| Mike Dunleavy (6)
| Kemper Arena13,885
| 1–0
|- align="center" bgcolor="#ffcccc"
| 2
| April 22
| @ Kansas City
| L 79–88
| Moses Malone (18)
| Moses Malone (15)
| Tom Henderson (7)
| Kemper Arena14,326
| 1–1
|- align="center" bgcolor="#ccffcc"
| 3
| April 24
| Kansas City
| W 92–88
| Reid, Paultz (20)
| Malone, Paultz (12)
| Mike Dunleavy (10)
| The Summit16,121
| 2–1
|- align="center" bgcolor="#ccffcc"
| 4
| April 26
| Kansas City
| W 100–89
| Moses Malone (42)
| Moses Malone (23)
| Robert Reid (9)
| The Summit16,121
| 3–1
|- align="center" bgcolor="#ccffcc"
| 5
| April 29
| @ Kansas City
| W 97–88
| Moses Malone (36)
| Moses Malone (11)
| Tom Henderson (6)
| Kemper Arena14,640
| 4–1
|-

|- align="center" bgcolor="#ffcccc"
| 1
| May 5
| @ Boston
| L 95–98
| Robert Reid (27)
| Moses Malone (15)
| Mike Dunleavy (7)
| Boston Garden15,320
| 0–1
|- align="center" bgcolor="#ccffcc"
| 2
| May 7
| @ Boston
| W 92–90
| Moses Malone (31)
| Moses Malone (15)
| three players tied (3)
| Boston Garden15,320
| 1–1
|- align="center" bgcolor="#ffcccc"
| 3
| May 9
| Boston
| L 71–94
| Moses Malone (23)
| Moses Malone (15)
| three players tied (2)
| The Summit16,121
| 1–2
|- align="center" bgcolor="#ccffcc"
| 4
| May 10
| Boston
| W 91–86
| Mike Dunleavy (28)
| Moses Malone (22)
| Tom Henderson (9)
| The Summit16,121
| 2–2
|- align="center" bgcolor="#ffcccc"
| 5
| May 12
| @ Boston
| L 80–109
| Moses Malone (20)
| Moses Malone (11)
| Allen Leavell (6)
| Boston Garden15,320
| 2–3
|- align="center" bgcolor="#ffcccc"
| 6
| May 14
| Boston
| L 91–102
| Robert Reid (27)
| Moses Malone (16)
| Henderson, Reid (5)
| The Summit16,121
| 2–4
|-

Player statistics

Season

Playoffs

Awards and records

Awards
 Moses Malone, All-NBA Second Team

Records

Transactions

Trades
October 7, 1980: Traded Paul Mokeski to the Detroit Pistons for a 1982 2nd round draft pick.

Free agents

Additions

Subtractions

See also
1980–81 NBA season

References

Houston Rockets seasons
Western Conference (NBA) championship seasons
Ho